Mamadu Saliu Djaló Pires is the current Minister of Foreign Affairs of Guinea-Bissau.

References

Living people
Foreign Ministers of Guinea-Bissau
Year of birth missing (living people)
Place of birth missing (living people)